Wu Ching Hui (born 15 May 1974) is a Hong Kong judoka. She competed in the women's half-middleweight event at the 1996 Summer Olympics.

References

External links
 

1974 births
Living people
Hong Kong female judoka
Olympic judoka of Hong Kong
Judoka at the 1996 Summer Olympics
Place of birth missing (living people)
Asian Games medalists in judo
Judoka at the 1994 Asian Games
Asian Games bronze medalists for Hong Kong
Medalists at the 1994 Asian Games